Grądy  is a village in the administrative district of Gmina Wąsewo, within Ostrów Mazowiecka County, Masovian Voivodeship, in east-central Poland.

History
In 1827, Grądy had a population of 99.

During the German occupation of Poland in World War II, from July 1941, the Germans operated the Stalag 324 prisoner-of-war camp for Soviet POWs in the village. In January 1942, it was relocated to Łosośna (present-day district of Grodno).

References

Villages in Ostrów Mazowiecka County